The Capitol City Dusters (also known as The Dusters) were an American post hardcore band formed in Washington, D.C. in 1996. The group's 1998 debut album combined elements of the hardcore punk movement in D.C., as well as sentiments reminiscent of the first wave of punk music. In 2002, after a brief hiatus, the band released a second full-length, Rock Creek.

History 

Originally known as the Dusters, the band formed in Washington, D.C. featuring the trio of Alec Bourgeios (lead guitar, vocals),
Bill Colgrove (bass guitar, vocals), Ben Azzara (drums). All three band members possessed previous experience in earlier punk bands, including Bourgeios' group Severin which released four singles in the early 1990s, Azzara's Delta 72, and Colgrove with his New York-based act, Foundation. The trio made its live debut at the Black Cat nightclub in June 1996, sharing the bill with Regulator Watts and the Most Secret Method. In October 1996, the Dusters released the vinyl-only single, "Forest Fire" paired with "Seventeen", on Superbad Records, a subsidiary of Dischord Records. Three songs by the band were featured on a split EP in early 1997 with fellow D.C. group the Most Secret Method.

Shortly after the EP was distributed, Colgrove departed the Dusters to establish his web design business called Threespot Media. Mark Lacrasse joined the band briefly as the Dusters' guest bassist to record their debut studio album, Simplicity. It was released in October 1998 under the name the Capitol City Dusters to avoid confusion between groups with a similar alias. After recruiting Jesse Quitsland, the band embarked on a US tour in late 1998 and early 1999 followed by a European tour accompanied with Spanish band Aina. The two acts concluded the tour with a split single, and the Capitol City Dusters took a year-long hiatus to rest from their hectic scheduling.

By 2001, the band returned from their break to record their second album Rock Creek, released in April 2002. Recognized as a concept album, Allison Fields of Pitchfork noted Rock Creek possesses influences from Fugazi on several tracks, most notably the opening song "Superimposed". The styles of the band, as music critic Jimmy Askew wrote for Snap Pop magazine, perfected the blend "between Quitslund’s quirky arrangements and guitarist Alec Bourgeois’ straightforward pop". Reception of the album was generally positive, as several reviews pointed to Rock Creek's stylistic similarities to early 1990s D.C. hardcore. To support the release of the album, the Capitol City Dusters conducted extensive tours throughout the US and Europe, often with Aina, throughout the year. Although the album and tour were the group's most successful to date, they decided to disband in 2003.

References 

American post-hardcore musical groups
Organizations established in 1998
Music organizations based in the United States